Weigela  is a genus of between six and 38 species of deciduous shrubs in the family Caprifoliaceae, growing to 1–5 m (3–15′) tall. All are natives of eastern Asia. The genus is named after the German scientist Christian Ehrenfried Weigel.

Description 
The leaves are 5–15 cm long, ovate-oblong with an acuminate tip, and with a serrated margin.

The flowers are 2–4 cm long, with a five-lobed white, pink, or red (rarely yellow) corolla, produced in small corymbs of several together in early summer.

The fruit is a dry capsule containing numerous small winged seeds.

Fossil record
Several  fossil seeds and fruit fragments of †Weigela srodoniowae have been described from middle Miocene strata of the Fasterholt area near Silkeborg in Central Jutland, Denmark.

Garden history
The first species to be collected for Western gardens, Weigela florida, distributed in North China, Korea and Manchuria, was found by Robert Fortune and imported to England in 1845. Following the opening of Japan to Westerners, several Weigela species and garden versions were "discovered" by European plant-hunters in the 1850s and 1860s, though they were already well known in Japan.

The British Weigela national collection is held at Sheffield Botanical Gardens; along with the national collection of the closely related genus Diervilla. The German Weigela national collection, Sichtungsgarten Weigela, is in Buckow, Märkische Schweiz.

Ecology
Weigela species are used as food plants by the larvae of some Lepidoptera species including brown-tail.

Accepted species

 Weigela coraeensis Thunb.
 Weigela decora (Nakai) Nakai
 Weigela floribunda  (Siebold & Zucc.) K.Koch
 Weigela florida  (Bunge) A.DC.
 Weigela × fujisanensis (Makino) Nakai
 Weigela hortensis (Siebold & Zucc.) K.Koch
 Weigela japonica Thunb.
 Weigela maximowiczii  (S.Moore) Rehder
 Weigela middendorfiana  (Carrière) K.Koch
 Weigela sanguinea (Nakai) Nakai
 Weigela suavis (Kom.) L.H.Bailey
 Weigela subsessilis (Nakai) L.H.Bailey

Cultivation

Several of the species are very popular ornamental shrubs in gardens, although species have been mostly superseded by hybrids (crosses between W. florida and other Asiatic species). The following cultivars have gained the Royal Horticultural Society's Award of Garden Merit:

 Weigela 'Red Prince'
 Weigela florida 'Alexandra'
 Weigela 'Florida Variegata'
 Weigela 'Praecox Variegata'

'Pink Princess' is a popular cultivar of Weigela, a shrub native to northern China, Korea, and Japan, that flowers profusely. It is a hardy plant, easy to grow and maintain. It is attractive to hummingbirds and  bees.

Gallery

References

External links

Weigela coraeensis - Images
British national collection at Sheffield Botanical Gardens

Caprifoliaceae
Caprifoliaceae genera